Berkeley Square, also known as Cadwalader Place, is a neighborhood located within the city of Trenton in Mercer County, New Jersey, United States. It is primarily a residential neighborhood consisting of detached, single-family homes constructed in the late 19th century and early 20th century. As an extremely early example of suburbia, it was listed on the National Register of Historic Places in 1980.

References

Neighborhoods in Trenton, New Jersey
National Register of Historic Places in Trenton, New Jersey